Dezső Váli (Budapest, 2 October 1942) is a Hungarian painter.

References 

1942 births
Living people